Chris Newman (born 30 October 1952) is a British acoustic guitarist and mandolinist, noted for his work as a soloist, as the partner of the Irish harper Máire Ní Chathasaigh, as a member of the Irish-English band, Heartstring Sessions, and with his own band, The Chris Newman Trio.

Life and career
He was born in Stevenage, Hertfordshire, England. He began playing guitar at the age of four and, in his teenage years, was mentored by the jazz guitarist Diz Disley. In the 1970s and 1980s, he worked as musical director and record producer for the singers Fred Wedlock and Brenda Wootton, at the same time establishing his identity as a soloist with the 1981 album, Chris Newman. He has subsequently worked with the Scottish-Irish Celtic music band, The Boys of the Lough. He has been principal guitar tutor for Newcastle University’s Folk B.Mus course since its inception, and regularly teaches at residential courses worldwide. He continues production work and has produced albums for many noted artists in the sphere of traditional and acoustic music, including Irish fiddler Nollaig Casey and acoustic guitarist Clive Carroll.

Albums
Chris Newman (1981) - solo
Chris Newman Two (1983) - solo
Fretwork (1998) - solo
Still Getting Away With It (2011) - solo
The Living Wood (1988) - with harper Máire Ní Chathasaigh
Out Of Court (1991) - with harper Máire Ní Chathasaigh
The Carolan Albums (1991) - with harper Máire Ní Chathasaigh
Live In The Highlands (1995) - with harper Máire Ní Chathasaigh
Dialogues (2001) - with harper Máire Ní Chathasaigh
Firewire (2006) - with harper Máire Ní Chathasaigh
Christmas Lights (2013) - with harper Máire Ní Chathasaigh
Breaking Bach (flat picking the partitas) (2021) - solo

Books
Adventure With A Flatpick (2001)

References

External links
Old Bridge Music official site

1952 births
Living people
British male guitarists
British mandolinists
People from Stevenage
British record producers
British music arrangers
British songwriters
British music educators
British male songwriters